Hush the Many was a band formed in London in 2004. The core members were Nima (guitar, male vocals) and Alexandra Brown (bass, female vocals), and other recent members were Jonathan White (guitar), Steph Patten (cello), Ella (viola) and Velibor (drums).   The band's full name is Hush The Many (Heed The Few) and they were signed to the Alcopop! Records independent record label.

Background
Hush the Many recorded their first EP in Nima’s bedroom in 2004, which Cargo Records heard and decided to distribute, and all 1,000 copies sold out.  Arts Council England subsequently funded two headline tours, and the band has also toured as support with Ed Harcourt, Fields and Clayhill.  

Hush the Many have played at numerous festivals in recent years including End of the Road, the Innocent Village Fete, the Amnesty International Freedom Festival, Lovebox Weekender, Twisted Folk, Bestival, Secret Garden Party and Glastonbury.

Collaborations often featured when Hush the Many played live. They have been joined by Joanna Quail (cello), Ruban Byrne (electric guitar), Jo Antoni (Satellites), Caroline Banks (Seafood), Jonnie Fielding (Larrikin Love, Nizlopi), Matt Ingram (Jeremy Warmsley), Kathleen McKie (Revere), Paul Reeves (Paris Motel), Howard Monk (Billy Mahonie, Barbarossa, Singing Adams), Nick Davis (Stone 3), Matt Harms (St Joan, After the Fox), George Napthine (Goldsounds, Grave Architects), Alistair Richardson, Jenny May Logan (Memory Band, ESQ), Seb (Sweetbriar), Matt (Semble), Betty (Semble), Greg Willow (Martha Tilston & The Woods), Phil Bassoon, Nicola Trumpet Faery, Tom (String n Bones) and Captain Banana.

Tracks have been aired on BBC Radio 1, Xfm, Northsound 1 and The Selector. The band have received coverage in The Sunday Times, The Independent, Drowned in Sound, and Rough Trade. 

A limited edition debut single on 7" vinyl, Song of a Page, was released on Fierce Panda's Fandango label in 2007. 

Their second single, Revolve, was released on 28 April 2008 on the Alcopop! Records label.  

Hush the Many disbanded in July 2008 and the frontman, Nima, went on to form Arrows of Love.

Discography

Singles
"Song of a Page" (Fandango, 2007)
"Song of a Page"
"In Bloom" (Live at End of the Road Festival)
released on 7" vinyl and as a download on 23 April 2007

"Revolve" (Alcopop! Records, 2008)
"Revolve"
"Storyend"
released on 7" vinyl and as a download on 28 April 2008

EPs
Mind the Sprawl (Handspun/Cargo Records, 2005)
"Desire Pt II"
"Song of a Page" (live)
"Paper Doll"
"Choose"
"Desire Pt III - Pandora's Box"
released 21 November 2005

References

External links
Myspace page
contactmusic interview from September 2006
Live review of 100 Club gig on 7 November 2007
Hush the Many on Obscure Sound
Review of Revolve on Gigwise

English folk musical groups
Anti-folk musicians
Alcopop! Records artists